The Mixed relay triathlon at the 2020 Summer Olympics took place at the Odaiba Marine Park in Tokyo on 31 July 2021.

The mixed team event featured teams of four (two men and two women). Each athlete performed a triathlon of  swim,  cycle, and a  run in a relay format.

Results

Notes

References 

Mixed
Mixed events at the 2020 Summer Olympics